Sparenberg is a surname. Notable people with the surname include:

Dave Sparenberg (born 1959), American football player
Ray Sparenberg, American horror host
René Sparenberg (1918–2013), Dutch field hockey player